Nick Statham (born 15 March 1975 in The Hague) is a former Dutch cricketer. He is a right-handed batsman and a right-arm off break bowler.

Statham's List A career stretches back to 1999, and he played for the Netherlands in the 2003 Cricket World Cup and Hermes DVS.

Sources
Nick Statham at Cricinfo

1975 births
Living people
Dutch cricketers
Netherlands One Day International cricketers
Cricketers at the 2003 Cricket World Cup
Sportspeople from The Hague